Alonzo Hartwell (19 February 1805 in Littleton, Massachusetts – 17 January 1873 in Waltham, Massachusetts) was an engraver and portrait artist in Boston, Massachusetts, in the 19th century. He trained with Abel Bowen in Boston and in 1826 went into business for himself. Hartwell's work appeared in the American Magazine of Useful and Entertaining Knowledge and other publications. Among Hartwell's students were artists George Loring Brown and Benjamin F. Childs.  In 1850, he received the silver medal of the Charlestown, Massachusetts, Mechanics' Association. He continued as an engraver until 1851, when he turned to portrait painting. Hartwell is buried in Mount Feake Cemetery in Waltham, MA. One of Hartwell's children, Henry Walker Hartwell, became an architect in the Boston firm Hartwell and Richardson.

Image gallery

References

External links

 
 
 Hartwell, Alonzo 1805-1873 at WorldCat
 Hartwell-Clark Family Papers at Massachusetts Historical Society

American engravers
1805 births
1873 deaths
19th century in Boston
Artists from Boston
People from Littleton, Massachusetts